Bob Fox (born 19 April 1953) is  a former Australian rules footballer who played with Footscray in the Victorian Football League (VFL).

Notes

External links 
		

Living people
1953 births
Australian rules footballers from Victoria (Australia)
Western Bulldogs players
Braybrook Football Club players